Richard Bühler (born 24 February 1915, date of death unknown) was a Swiss ski jumper. He competed in the individual event at the 1936 Winter Olympics.

References

1915 births
Year of death missing
Swiss male ski jumpers
Olympic ski jumpers of Switzerland
Ski jumpers at the 1936 Winter Olympics
Place of birth missing